Srini Santhanam (born 21 May 1984) is an American cricketer. He was named in the United States squad for the 2013 ICC World Twenty20 Qualifier tournament. He made his Twenty20 debut during the tournament, against Canada, on 15 November 2013.

References

External links
 

1984 births
Living people
American cricketers
Cricketers from Chennai
American sportspeople of Indian descent